The Old Catholic Church of the Netherlands, sometimes known as the Dutch Roman Catholic Church of the Old Episcopal Order, the Church of Utrecht (Ultrajectine Church), or Jansenist Church of Holland, is an Old Catholic jurisdiction originating from the Archdiocese of Utrecht (695–1580). The Old Catholic Church of the Netherlands is the mother church of the Old Catholic Union of Utrecht.

The jurisdiction is currently led by Archbishop Metropolitan Bernd Wallet.

History

Early history 
St. Willibrord evangelised the northern parts of the Netherlands (above the Rhine), bringing Roman Catholicism in the 7th century. The southern parts of the now so-called Benelux were already evangelised from the 4th century, beginning with St. Servatius, Bishop of Maastricht. Willibrord had been consecrated by Pope Sergius I in circa 696 in Rome.

In 1145, Pope Eugene III restricted the electorate to the chapters of the five collegiate churches in the diocese. The Fourth Lateran Council confirmed this in 1215. John Mason Neale explained that Leo X only confirmed a right of the church but Leo X's confirmation "was providential" in respect to the future schism.

Reformation and Jansenism 

Forced into hiding as a result of the Protestant Reformation, the diocesan structures of the Catholic Church of the Netherlands were dissolved. The Holland Mission started when Pope Clement VIII erected the Apostolic Vicariate of Batavia in 1592. Eventually, the church obtained a comfortable enough status with the local authorities so as to allow it to practice Catholicism as long as this did not take place in public or semi-public buildings and areas. However, conflicts arose between Jesuit missionaries sent from Rome and the local clergy. This was augmented by an influx of Jansenist priests from France and Belgium.

The Jesuits accused Archbishop Petrus Codde, apostolic vicar, of Jansenism. Pope Innocent XII appointed a commission of cardinals who started an investigation of Codde, ending in exoneration. In 1700, Codde was summoned to Rome and brought before a second commission appointed by Pope Clement XI. When Codde refused assent to the Formula of Submission for the Jansenists, Clement XI suspended Codde in 1701 and appointed a successor, as apostolic vicar. This decision was not popular among the Dutch clergy, who demanded the return of Codde. Codde returned to Utrecht in June 1703 and formally resigned—protesting the circumstances—in a pastoral letter of March 19, 1704. He died on December 18, 1710.

Although the historic archdiocese was suppressed in 1580, and its replacement, the apostolic vicariate, was erected in 1592, the chapter of the suppressed archdiocese arranged for Luke Fagan, Bishop of Meath, to ordain priests for the suppressed archdiocese in 1716. The canonical matters arising from the supposed Roman violations of  led to the case being brought before the Pontifical Catholic University of Leuven in May 1717, which found in favour of the chapter of the suppressed archdiocese, but was unable to resolve the matter with Rome; this led to a de facto autonomous Catholic church in the Netherlands.

Finally in 1723, dissatisfied Dutch clergy elected  as archbishop of the suppressed Archdiocese of Utrecht. He was consecrated in 1724 without a papal mandate by suspended Bishop Dominique Marie Varlet, who had been living in Amsterdam since 1721. Both Varlet and Steenoven were suspended for illicit episcopal consecration, and excommunicated for claiming a diocesan see of jurisdiction without the permission of the Roman Pontiff. Varlet later reconciled with the Catholic Church, but subsequently consecrated, again without a papal mandate, four more bishops for the independent Ultrajectine church, which would become known as "Old Catholic" after 1853. Petrus Johannes Meindaerts, after his consecration by Varlet without a papal mandate in 1739, consecrated bishops to the suppressed dioceses of Deventer, Haarlem, and 

The apostolic vicariate was reduced to a mission sui iuris by Pope Benedict XIII in 1727.

Most Dutch Catholics nevertheless continued to follow the pope, first under missionary administrative structures and, from 1853, under the reestablished episcopal hierarchy in the Netherlands, when Catholics were permitted to worship publicly after two and a half centuries of secret and private religious worship.

Vatican I 
After reestablishment of the episcopal hierarchy in the Netherlands in 1853 by Pope Pius IX, the breakaway Church of Utrecht adopted the name "Old Catholic Church" to distinguish itself from the newly created Roman hierarchy by its seniority in the Netherlands. In 1870 the First Vatican Council was convened, and the bishops of the Church of Utrecht were not invited because they were not seen as being in communion with the Holy See. At the First Vatican Council, papal primacy in jurisdiction and the Catholic dogma of papal infallibility were defined, to the objection of the Old Catholic Church of the Netherlands and some communities in Germany, Austria and Switzerland. Several separate communities were formed at this time and sought apostolic succession from the Old Catholic Archbishop of Utrecht, eventually forming the Union of Utrecht of the Old Catholic Churches, and these German speaking communities adopted the name Old Catholic. The schism was able to continue.

Doctrine 
Old Catholics have celebrated Mass in the vernacular virtually since their foundation, even if not everywhere, doing so as early as the 18th century in Utrecht. They reject the Catholic dogmas of the Immaculate Conception and Assumption of Mary as well as papal infallibility. Old Catholics believe they preserve ancient Catholic doctrine through adherence to the "ancient Catholic faith". Their practice of private confession has fallen into disuse in most areas. Since 1878, Old Catholic clergy have been allowed to marry at any time. It would also seem that, by the beginning of the 20th century, the Eucharistic fast had been abandoned, along with Benediction of the Blessed Sacrament and the veneration of the saints; in his declaration of ecclesial independence of December 29, 1910, Arnold Harris Mathew wrote to the Old Catholics of Utrecht deploring the lack of these practices among Old Catholics on the European continent.

Old Catholic Archbishops of Utrecht 

The Metropolitan Archbishop of Utrecht (not to be confused with the Catholic prelate who holds the same title) is the leader of the Old Catholic Church of the Netherlands, and chairman of its governing bodies. He is also ex officio the primate (primus inter pares leader) of the entire Old Catholic Church. The current archbishop is Bernd Wallet. Individual national or regional Old Catholic churches maintain a degree of autonomy, similar to the practice of the Anglican Communion, so that each diocese of the Old Catholic Union of Utrecht has a diocesan bishop, and countries with more than one diocese have a bishop who is appointed "bishop in charge" (or similar title). All, however, recognise the Archbishop of Utrecht as primate.

 Cornelius van Steenoven (1723–1725)
 Cornelius Johannes Barchman Wuytiers (1725–1733)
 Theodorus van der Croon (1734–1739)
 Petrus Johannes Meindaerts (1739–1767)
 Walter van Nieuwenhuisen (1768–1797)
 Johannes Jacobus van Rhijn (1797–1808)
 Willibrord van Os (1814–1825)
 Johannes van Santen (1825–1858)
 Henricus Loos (1858–1873)
 Johannes Heijkamp (1875–1892)
 Gerardus Gul (1892–1920)
 Franciscus Kenninck (1920–1937)
 Andreas Rinkel (1937–1970)
 Marinus Kok (1970–1982)
 Antonius Jan Glazemaker (1982–2000)
 Joris Vercammen (2000–2020)
 Bernd Wallet (2020–present)

Old Catholic Bishops of Haarlem 

The Old Catholic Bishops of Haarlem continue to govern the see first overseen by Bishops Nicolas van Nieuwland (1560-1569) and Godfrey van Mierlo (1569-1578) of the Catholic Church.

 Hieronymus de Bock (1742-1744)
 Johannes an Stiphout (1745-1777)
 Adrianus Johannes Broekman (1778-1800)
 Johannes Nieuwenhuis (1801-1810)
 Johannes Bon (1819-1841)
 Henricus Johannes van Buul (1843-1862)
 Lambertus de Jong (1865-1867)
 Gaspardus Johannes Rinkel (1873-1906)
 Johannes Jacobus van Thiel (1906-1912)
 Nicolas Prins (1912-1916)
 Henricus Johannes Theodorus van Vlijmen (1916-1945)
 Jacobus van der Oord (1945-1967)
 Gerhardus van Kleef (1967-1987)
 Teunis Johannes Horstman (1987-1994)
 Jan Lambert Wirix-Speetjens (1994-2008)
 Dirk Jan Schoon (2008-)

Old Catholic Bishops of Deventer 

The Old Catholic Bishops of Deventer continue to govern the see first overseen by Bishops Johannes Mahusius (1560-1570) and Egidius van den Berge de Monte (1570-1577) of the Catholic Church.

 Bartholomaeus Johannes Byeveld (1758-1778)
 Nicolas Nellemans (1778-1805)
 Gisbertus de Jong (1805-1824)
 William Vet (1825-1853)
 Hermannus Heykamp (1853-1874)
 Cornelius Diependaal (1875-1893)
 Nicolas Bartholomaeus Petrus Spit (1894-1929)
 Johannes Hermannus Berends (1873-1906)
 Johannes Jacobus van Thiel (1929-1940)
 Engelbert Lagerwey (1940-1959)
 Petrus Josephus Jans (1959-1979)
 Antonius Jan Glazemaker (1979-1982)

Footnotes

References

External links 
 
 Sources related to Jansenism and Old Catholicism

Union of Utrecht of the Old Catholic Churches
History of Christianity in the Netherlands
Members of the World Council of Churches
Catholicism in the Netherlands

hu:Ókatolikus
nl:Oud-katholieke Kerk